"Broodje Bakpao" is a song recorded by Dutch rapper Big2, from the hip hop duo The Opposites, featuring rappers Gers and Sef. The song is based on the popular Dutch sketch show New Kids. The single was released on 4 December 2009 through TopNotch. It was produced by Big2, and co-written by Twan van Steenhoven, Yousef Gnaoui, Gerwin Pardoel and Steffen Haars. The single became a success in the Netherlands and Belgium.

Background
The single is based on the Dutch comedy sketch show New Kids, a popular television series in the Netherlands, with the programme's popularity being the main reason behind the success of "Broodje Bakpao". The song lyrics refer to the consumption of Bakpau, a Chinese Indonesian dish often popular in the Netherlands, where it is known as a "broodje Bapao".

Chart performance
"Broodje Bakpao" became a success in the Netherlands and Flanders. In the Netherlands, the song reached number 1 in the Mega Single Top 100, where it stayed at the top for two weeks. It reached number 2 in the Dutch Top 40 and remained there for three weeks. In Flanders, the song reached the third position in the Ultratop 50.

Music video
In the music video, the characters of New Kids are eating Bakpau. As of December 2015, the video on YouTube was watched over 3.4 million times. The cover art of the single is a screenshot of the music video.

Track listing
CD single
"Broodje Bakpao" – 3:15

Personnel
Songwriting – Twan van Steenhoven, Yousef Gnaoui, Gerwin Pardoel, Steffen Haars
Production – Big2

Charts and certifications

Weekly charts

Year-end charts

Release history

References

2009 songs
2009 singles